The  is an  Japanese railway line in Ueda, Nagano, Japan, operated by the private railway operator . It connects Ueda and Bessho-Onsen stations. This is currently the only railway line Ueda Dentetsu operates. Although the company is the root of its holding company, the group now mainly operates resort amusement facilities and bus lines. Ueda Kōtsū is owned by Tokyu Corporation. The railway line lacked funds to upgrade the infrastructure to meet the new safety standards, and separated to become the present company.

Stations

Rolling stock
, the fleet of trains operated on the line is as follows.
 1000 series 2-car EMUs x4 (former Tokyu 1000 series, since 2008)
 6000 series 2-car EMU x1 (former Tokyu 1000 series, since 28 March 2015)
 7200 series 2-car EMU x1 (former Tokyu 7200 series, since 29 March 1998)

1000 series
Eight former Tokyu 1000 series EMU end cars were resold to the Ueda Electric Railway, and reformed as four two-car 1000 series sets.

Formations

6000 series
In 2015, two former Tokyu Toyoko Line 1000 series intermediate cars (DeHa 1255 and DeHa 1305) were resold to the Ueda Electric Railway, which were reformed as a two-car 6000 series set with the addition of new cab ends.

Formation

Car identities
The former identities of the fleet are as shown below.

History
The first section of the line opened on 17 June 1921, using a 600 V DC overhead power supply. The line voltage was raised to 1,500 V DC from 1 October 1986. Wanman driver-only operation commenced on the line from 3 October 2005.

In 2009, the company sold out affiliated companies that Joden Bus and Joden Taxi to Jay Will Partners.

From 1 April 2016, station numbering was introduced on the line, with stations numbered from "BE01" to "BE15".

See also
List of railway companies in Japan
List of railway lines in Japan
Ueda Bus (This company had been a subsidiary until 2009)

References

External links 
  

Railway lines in Japan
Railway lines in Nagano Prefecture
Railway lines opened in 1921
1067 mm gauge railways in Japan
1921 establishments in Japan